Pierre Chambon (born 7 February 1931 in Mulhouse, France) was the founder of the  in Strasbourg, France. He was one of the leading molecular biologists who utilized gene cloning and sequencing technology to first decipher the structure of eukaryotic genes and their modes of regulation. His major contributions to science include the identification of RNA polymerase II (B), the identification of transcriptional control elements, the cloning and dissection of nuclear hormone receptors, revealing their structure and showing how they contribute to human physiology. His group was also one of the first to demonstrate, biochemically and electron-microscopically, that the nucleosome is the smallest unit of chromatin (Cell, Vol. 4, 281–300, 1975). He accomplished much of his work in the 1970s – 1990s.

Chambon was elected a Foreign Associate of the US National Academy of Sciences and to the French Académie des Sciences in 1985, a foreign member of the Royal Swedish Academy of Sciences in 1987. He was awarded the Louisa Gross Horwitz Prize from Columbia University in 1999 and a second time in 2018. In 2003 he was awarded the March of Dimes Prize in Developmental Biology. He received the Albert Lasker Award for Basic Medical Research in 2004 for his work in the field. In 2010, Chambon was awarded the Gairdner Foundation International Award "for the elucidation of fundamental mechanisms of transcription in animal cells and to the discovery of the nuclear receptor superfamily". In 2018 he received the Louisa Gross Horwitz Prize for a second time.

Notes

References

External links
 The Official Site of Louisa Gross Horwitz Prize
 ISI Highly Cited page

Living people
1931 births
Academic staff of the Collège de France
Foreign associates of the National Academy of Sciences
Members of the French Academy of Sciences
Members of the Royal Swedish Academy of Sciences
French molecular biologists
French geneticists
French endocrinologists
French people of Jewish descent
Scientists from Mulhouse
University of Strasbourg alumni
Recipients of the Albert Lasker Award for Basic Medical Research
Fellows of the AACR Academy
Commandeurs of the Légion d'honneur
Grand Officers of the Ordre national du Mérite
Richard-Lounsbery Award laureates